Shooting is an important Olympic sport in India. Of India's 35 Olympic medals, four have come from shooting, including a gold by Abhinav Bindra in the 2008 Olympics. Indian shooters who have excelled at international events include Abhinav Bindra, Jaspal Rana, Jitu Rai, Rajyavardhan Singh Rathore, Vijay Kumar, Gagan Narang, Apurvi Chandela, Ronjan Sodhi, Anjali Bhagwat, Heena Sidhu, Shreyasi Singh, Manu Bhaker, Anisa Sayyed, Rahi Sarnobat and Saurabh Chaudhary.

History 
Shooting sports have a varied history in India. Initially they were played by royal people of British India for amusement and recreation. The highest governing body of shooting sports in India is National Rifle Association of India (NRAI), which was established on 17 April 1951. From then on India achieved some success in the Olympic games by winning a Gold. But largely this sport is not affordable to command Indians because of a lack of shooting ranges and facilities in the country.

2012 Olympics
The Indian shooting contingent for the 2012 London was one of the largest to date. There were a total of 11 shooters including 4 female shooters. India's first medal in the 2012 Olympics was when Gagan Narang won the bronze in the 10m Air Rifle event. This was the same event in which  Abhinav Bindra won India's first individual gold medal in the 2008 Summer Olympics Beijing. The second medal came from the unheralded army man Vijay Kumar when he won the silver in the 25m rapid fire pistol event after finishing 4th in the qualification rounds. He had to fend off some tough competition from the third placed Chinese Ding Feng.

A notable performance was made by Joydeep Karmakar who finished 4th in the 50m rifle prone event. A strong medal prospect Ronjan Sodhi who is an Asian Games gold medallist, however crashed out in the qualification rounds of the Double trap event.

Medal winners at Summer Olympics

Total medals won by Indian Shooters in Major tournaments

Other Notable Performances at Summer Olympics

Administration
The sport is administered in India by The National Rifle Association of India. The association organises the following tournaments every year:
 National Shooting Championship Competitions (NSCC)
 All India G.V. Mavlankar Shooting Championship (AIGVMSC)
 Sardar Sajjan Singh Sethi Memorial Masters Shooting Championship
 Kumar Surendra Singh Memorial Shooting Championship
 All India Kumar Surendra Singh Memorial Inter School Shooting Championship

See also 

 Shooting at the Summer Olympics

References

External links 

India's 1st website on Shooting Sports – indianshooting.com

Article page 94 and 95 on Adhiraj Singh Devra and his shooting initiatives https://www.rajputanacollective.com/magazine/order-now/rajputana-collective-issue-4-instagram-generations-edition/